Enarganthe is a genus of flowering plants belonging to the family Aizoaceae. It contains a single species, Enarganthe octonaria.

Its native range is South African Republic.

References

Aizoaceae
Aizoaceae genera
Monotypic Caryophyllales genera
Taxa named by N. E. Brown